The Thorold Blackhawks are a Canadian junior ice hockey team based in Thorold, Ontario. They play in the Golden Horseshoe division of the Greater Ontario Junior Hockey League.

History
The Thorold Jaycees joined the Niagara District Junior B Hockey League in 1963, three seasons after the folding of the Thorold Mountaineers.  The Jaycees became the Paper Bees in 1975 and stayed with the league until 1979 when it folded.  From 1979 until 1982, the team was known as the Thorold Paper C's and played in the local Niagara & District Junior C Hockey League.  In 1982, the Paper C's became the Blackhawks and joined Golden Horseshoe Junior B Hockey League.  The Blackhawks stayed members of the GHJHL until 2007 when it merged into the GOJHL.

The team consists of mostly local players between the ages of 16 and 21. The Blackhawks were League Champions in 2001, 2003, 2004, and 2005. In 2005, the team went on to capture the Sutherland Cup as the best Jr. B team in Ontario. Many players that started their careers in Thorold went on to play in the Ontario Hockey League, the American Hockey League, and the National Hockey League. Notable alumni include Nathan Horton, Sean Bentivoglio, John Scott, Zenon Konopka, Dwayne Roloson and Owen Nolan.

The Blackhawks played the longest game in club history on March 26, 2006 in a quadruple-overtime thriller of game 6 of their GHL Semi-final series against their arch-rival, the St. Catharines Falcons. The Blackhawks moved onto the GHL finals with this victory. The final score of this contest was 2-1 after Steve Zmudcynski beat St. Catharines' netminder Sean Hall with 5:06 left in the 4th overtime period. Zmudczynski was criticized for much of the overtime session for not getting back on defense but was rewarded for doing so when he received a long pass from Steve Chappell that set up the winning marker. The game lasted a little over four and a half hours and ended after midnight. An interesting side note from this game is that if there would have been a game seven it would have been played on March 27, the same day Game 6 ended.

Logo
In October 2013, a Facebook page called Is The Thorold Blackhawks Logo Offensive? was started, which questioned the use of an aboriginal caricature as the team's logo. The page garnered attention from local media and politicians and was brought to the attention of Thorold City Council.

On August 4, 2016, Mayor Ted Luciani announced that the logo would be prohibited from the city's arenas from June 1, 2017. The prohibition would apply to jerseys, signage and marketing materials. Luciani said that the city council had been working with the club since 2013 "to resolve the logo issue amicably" and that the club had been given "more than reasonable opportunity to address the issue." As a result, he said, "The City of Thorold will no longer permit the continued use of a logo that has been deemed offensive."

During a pre-game ceremony at Frank Dougherty Arena on November 3, 2016, the team unveiled their replacement logo, a stylized head of a black bird of prey. Co-owner Tony Gigliotti – who had inherited the controversial logo when he bought the team in 2013 – said: "I understand how the old logo could offend people and that is something we never wanted to be part of. I created [the] new logo with the blackbird theme a few years ago with a graphic design guy in Toronto [James Brandan Walker] and we have tweaked it since then. I actually love the new logo and it is easily identifiable for young children and all our fans so we think it will be part of a good marketing plan in the future."

2016-17 season
On February 14, 2017, the Blackhawks announced they were ceasing operations for the remainder of the season due to inability to sustain a full roster. Citing concerns for player safety, the team elected to cease operations with 8 games remaining in the season, which will be recorded as 5-0 forfeit wins for their opponent.

Season-by-season results

Sutherland Cup appearances
2001: Elmira Sugar Kings defeated Thorold Blackhawks 4-games-to-2
2003: Stratford Cullitons defeated Thorold Blackhawks 4-games-to-3
2004: Stratford Cullitons defeated Thorold Blackhawks 4-games-to-none
2005: Thorold Blackhawks defeated Chatham Maroons 4-games-to-1

Professional alumni
Vince Dunn
John Scott
Conor Timmins
Sean Bentivoglio
Matt Pizzo - team list maker
Dwayne Roloson
Nathan Horton

References

External links
Blackhawks Webpage
GOJHL Webpage

Golden Horseshoe Junior B Hockey League teams
Thorold